Give My Regards to Broad Street is a 1984 British musical drama film directed by Peter Webb. It stars Paul McCartney, Bryan Brown and Ringo Starr. The film covers a fictional day in the life of McCartney, who wrote the film for the screen, and McCartney, Starr and Linda McCartney all appeared as themselves. Despite Give My Regards to Broad Street being unsuccessful, both financially and critically, its soundtrack album sold well. The title is a take on George M. Cohan's classic show tune "Give My Regards to Broadway" and makes reference to London's Broad Street railway station, which would close in 1986.

Filming and recording of Broad Street began in November 1982, after the completion of Pipes of Peace. Production on the album and film continued until July the following year. In the interim, Pipes of Peace and its singles were released, and the film project was thus scheduled for an autumn 1984 release once an appropriate amount of time had passed.

Plot
Paul (Paul McCartney) is stuck in a traffic jam in his chauffeur-driven car on his way to an interview.  He daydreams that he is driving himself in a flashier car crammed with modern technology around the countryside when he gets a call from Steve (Bryan Brown) that Harry (Ian Hastings), a reformed criminal, is missing along with the master tapes he was supposed to give to the factory the previous day. Paul races to the studio to find that the police are already there investigating the matter, thinking that Harry is back to his old ways and plans to bootleg the tapes. The news gets worse when Mr. Rath (John Bennett), to whom the studio owes money, arrives with the news that he will take over the record company if the tapes aren't found by midnight.

Following the meeting, the film follows a day in the life of Paul and his work with wife Linda McCartney and friend Ringo Starr, which includes filming two videos, rehearsing in a loft, and recording performances for the radio. In between this, Paul wonders what Harry might have done: did he give the master tapes to be bootlegged, did he just run off, or was he murdered? During several songs, Paul has elaborate fantasies in various settings and costumes inspired by his predicament.  Once the day is done, Paul goes out driving around London while his associates brace themselves for the takeover as midnight approaches. While driving towards Broad Street, Paul remembers that Harry was headed there when he last saw him and goes exploring the station.  Eventually, he finds the blue case containing the tapes on a platform bench, and Harry in a small maintenance building nearby, where he had accidentally trapped himself looking for the toilet. They both laugh, and as they drive off, Paul informs Linda, and Linda informs the studio at the last minute, that the tapes have been found and the takeover is averted.  Paul's chauffeur-driven car finally arrives at its destination and he is awoken from his slumber.

Cast

Film history
The film was the result of a long-held ambition of McCartney, a lifelong film fan, to become involved in acting again after his success with the Beatles' films.

While Give My Regards to Broad Street was occasionally described in the press as McCartney's first film in 14 years, this was not in fact the case, as Rockshow had been released 4 years before, though it was mainly made up of Wings' concert footage.

Broad Street was one of the last film appearances of Sir Ralph Richardson, who plays an older man named Jim that McCartney visits late in the movie, looking for Harry. Some critics have pointed out Jim's similarity to McCartney's father (who was also named James; Richardson's character even refers to McCartney as "son") and appears to be something of a poet—the elder McCartney had his own jazz band in the 1940s. (McCartney has said that he actually based the character on Polonius, from William Shakespeare's Hamlet.)

Rupert and the Frog Song
The 13-minute animated film Rupert and the Frog Song was shown in cinemas immediately preceding Give My Regards to Broad Street. The short film contained the song "We All Stand Together", sung by McCartney and "the Frog Chorus". Simultaneously with the film's premiere in November, "We All Stand Together" was released as a single and became a hit in the UK, reaching #3.

Video game
A video game based on the film was released for the Commodore 64 and ZX Spectrum home computers in 1985. The game was developed by Argus Press Software and released in their Mind Games series. The C64 version was also published by Mastertronic in the US (Cat. no. ICD-0082).

The game takes place after the action of the film and it is discovered that one track from the album was missing from the recovered tapes. The missing track was also going to be the lead single so without it, the studio is back in jeopardy. The player takes the role of McCartney who must travel around London to track down members of the band and other people who were at the original studio session to help piece the track back together. The game package contained a fold out map of London and profiles of the characters which the player needs to use to predict where to find them.

Reception
Although its soundtrack was a success, the film itself was met with negative reviews. It received a 21% positive rating on Rotten Tomatoes, based on reviews by 14 critics.

Roger Ebert of the Chicago Sun-Times gave the film one out of four stars, praising its music as "wonderful" but said it "is about as close as you can get to a nonmovie, and the parts that do try something are the worst." He particularly criticized the long and irrelevant dream sequences and the poor photography, and advised readers to buy the soundtrack album and not bother seeing the film itself.

Awards and nominations
"No More Lonely Nights", a song from the film, was nominated for a Golden Globe Award and a BAFTA Film Award for Best Original Song-Motion Picture.

References

External links

1984 films
20th Century Fox films
British musical films
1980s musical drama films
British drama films
Paul McCartney
Films with screenplays by Paul McCartney
1984 directorial debut films
1984 drama films
1980s English-language films
1980s British films